Hygrophorus hypothejus, commonly known as herald of the winter, is an edible species of fungus in the genus Hygrophorus native to Europe. It appears in late autumn in coniferous forests, often with the first frosts.

Taxonomy
Elias Magnus Fries described this species in 1821 as Agaricus hypothejus, before placing it in the genus Hygrophorus in 1838. Its species name is derived from the Ancient Greek words hypo and theios "sulphur yellow underneath". It has the common name of herald of the winter as it appears in autumn with the onset of the first overnight frosts. Alternate names are late fall waxy cap in the United States, and yellow-gilled waxcap.

Description
The yellow gills are decurrent, and the flesh is pale yellow, turning orange-red when bruised. The colour can become more intense with the onset of frosts. The spore print is white and the oval spores measure 7–9 x 4–5 micrometres.

Distribution and habitat
The mushroom grows in coniferous forests, appearing in October and November, occasionally December. Though mushrooms may be abundant, they are often hard to spot among the pine needles. They often appear in big groups of individuals and clusters.

Edibility
It is edible but of variable quality as some specimens may be slimy.

Similar species
Hygrophorus hypothejus could be confused with the slimy spike cap (Gomphidius glutinosus), though the gills of the latter separate easily from the cap (unlike the herald of winter). Hygrophorus speciosus is also similar.

References

External links
 
 

hypothejus
Edible fungi
Fungi of Europe
Fungi of North America
Fungi described in 1821
Taxa named by Elias Magnus Fries